The collared carpetshark (Parascyllium collare) is a poorly understood species of carpetshark of the family Parascylliidae endemic to the waters of eastern Australia between latitudes 26°S and 38°S. It is typically found  in depth near the floor of rocky reefs on the continental shelf, though its depth range can extend between . At a maximum length of only , it poses no threat to humans. It is common within its range and is not targeted species. This, combined with high survival rates after discardment and a significant portion of habitat untouched by fishing are why it is listed as Least Concern by the International Union for Conservation of Nature (IUCN). Reproduction is oviparous and embryos feed solely on yolk.

References

 Compagno, Dando, & Fowler, Sharks of the World, Princeton University Press, New Jersey 2005

External links
 
 

collared carpetshark
Fauna of New South Wales
Marine fish of Eastern Australia
collared carpetshark